Harry Siegel (born 1977) is a senior editor for The Daily Beast.

Biography
Siegel is a lifelong resident of the Brooklyn area of New York City.  He graduated from Brandeis University, Siegel worked at The New York Sun as an editorial writer and the paper's first op-ed page editor when it launched in 2002. He would go on to found the web magazine New Partisan with Tim Marchman. Siegel was editor-in-chief of the New York Press in 2005 and 2006, and worked as an editor at Politico from 2008-2010. In the 2010-2011 academic year, he was a Knight-Wallace Fellow at the University of Michigan. He has also worked  in politics at times, working as a researcher for political consultant Hank Sheinkopf in 2001, and as policy director for New York State gubernatorial candidate Thomas Suozzi in 2006.

Writing
Siegel is co-author (with his father Fred Siegel) of The Prince of the City: Giuliani, New York and the Genius of American Life, which appeared on the 100 Notable Books of 2005 list compiled by The New York Times.  Siegel's commentary has appeared in The Wall Street Journal, City Journal, The New Republic, The New York Post, The New York Observer and The Weekly Standard.  He has made guest appearances on CNN, MSNBC and National Public Radio.

References

External links
Articles by Harry Siegel
CNN Reliable Sources Transcript of discussion by panel that included Siegel and Howard Kurtz
CNN Lou Dobbs Tonight Transcript of panel that included Siegel and Lou Dobbs
The Situation With Tucker Carlson Transcript of panel that included Siegel and Tucker Carlson

People from Brooklyn
Brandeis University alumni
Living people
1977 births
New York Press people
University of Michigan fellows